Hemmatabad-e Zamani (also Romanized as Hemmatābād-e Zamānī; also known as Hemmatābād and Hemmatābād-e Zamānābād) is a village in Takht-e Jolgeh Rural District, in the Central District of Firuzeh County, Razavi Khorasan Province, Iran. At the 2006 census, its population was 1,447, in 390 families.

References 

Populated places in Firuzeh County